Oreophryne variabilis is a species of frog in the family Microhylidae.
It is endemic to Sulawesi, Indonesia.
Its natural habitat is subtropical or tropical moist montane forests.
It is threatened by habitat loss.

References

variabilis
Endemic fauna of Indonesia
Amphibians of Sulawesi
Taxa named by George Albert Boulenger
Amphibians described in 1896
Taxonomy articles created by Polbot